KSP may refer to:

Organisations
 Kentucky State Police
 Kerala Socialist Party
 Polonia Warsaw, a Polish sports club
 Klub Sceptyków Polskich, a Polish skeptical organisation
 Presidential Staff Office of Indonesia

Science and technology
 Keyword Services Platform
 Key signing party, an event where people verify each other's digital cryptographic keys
 Solubility product constant (Ksp); see solubility equilibrium
 k shortest path routing

Other uses
 Karolinska Scales of Personality, a Swedish personality questionnaire
 Kerbal Space Program, a space flight simulator game